Perea or Peraea (Greek: Περαία, "the country beyond") was the portion of the kingdom of Herod the Great occupying the eastern side of the Jordan River valley, from about one third the way down the Jordan River segment connecting the Sea of Galilee and the Dead Sea to about one third the way down the north-eastern shore of the Dead Sea; it did not extend very far to the east. Herod the Great's kingdom was bequeathed to four heirs, of which Herod Antipas received both Perea and Galilee. He dedicated the city Livias in the north of the Dead Sea. In 39 CE, Perea and Galilee were transferred from disfavoured Antipas to Agrippa I by Caligula. With his death in 44 CE, Agrippa's merged territory was made a province again, including Judaea and for the first time, Perea. From that time Perea was part of the shifting Roman provinces to its west: Judaea, and later Syria Palaestina, Palaestina and Palaestina Prima. Attested mostly in Josephus' books, the term was in rarer use in the late Roman period. It appears in Eusebius' Greek language geographical work, Onomasticon, but in the Latin translation by Jerome, Transjordan is used.

Gadara or Gadora of Perea (identified as Tell Jadur near Al-Salt) was the chief city or metropolis of Perea (not to be confused with Gadara of the Decapolis−a Hellenistic city). Following the Roman conquest of Judea led by Pompey in 63 BCE, Aulus Gabinius, proconsul of Syria, split the former Hasmonean Kingdom into five districts of legal and religious councils known as synedrion (in Jewish context better known as Sanhedrin) and based at Jerusalem, Jericho, Sepphoris (Galilee), Amathus (Perea) and Gadara (either Perea—Al-Salt, Decapolis—Umm Qais, or biblical Gezer, mentioned by Josephus under a Hellenised form of its Semitic name, Gadara, edited to "Gazara" in the Loeb edition).

Pliny the Elder and Josephus
 c. 78 CE Pliny the Elder in his work, Naturalis Historia, Book 5(15) wrote;
['Greater Judea' or 'Provincia Iudaea', incorporates Samaria and Idumea into an expanded territory.] The part of Judaea adjoining Syria is called Galilee, and that next to Arabia and Egypt Peraea. Peraea is covered with rugged mountains, and is separated from the other parts of Judaea by the river Jordan (in the original Latin: "Supra Idumaeam et Samariam Iudaea longe lateque funditur. Pars eius Syriae iuncta Galilaea vocatur, Arabiae vero et Aegypto proxima Peraea, asperis dispersa montibus et a ceteris Iudaeis Iordane amne discreta.")

 c. 75 CE Josephus in his work, The Jewish War, Book 3(3) wrote;
Peraea ...much larger indeed [than Galilee], is generally desert and rugged, and too wild for the growth of delicate fruits. In some parts, however the soil is loamy and prolific, and trees of various kinds cover the plains ; but the olive-tree, the vine, and the palm tree, are those principally cultivated. It is also sufficiently irrigated by mountain streams ; and (should these in the dog-days fail) by ever flowing springs. In length, it extends from Machaerus to Pella : in breadth, from Philadelphia to the Jordan : its northern districts being bounded, as we have already said, by Pella ; and those on the west, by the river. The land of Moab forms its southern limit ; while Arabia and Silbonitis, with Philadelphia and Gerasa, constitute its eastern boundary.Silbonitis is a textual error for Sebonitis, i.e. Heshbon.

Other authors
Ptolemy does not use the term Perea in his Geography, but rather the periphrasis "across the Jordan". And he enumerates the "Perean" cities; Cosmas, Libias, Callirhoe, Gazorus, Epicaeros in this district.

In the Bible

According to the Hebrew Bible, the Transjordan region was home to the Israelite tribes Reuben, Gad, and the half tribe of Manasseh. The original Biblical Hebrew text does not use the word "Perea", but rather the Hebrew term עבר הירדן‎ (romanized: Ever HaYarden, lit. 'beyond the Jordan'). In some cases, the Tanakh uses the related term “Gilead”, which usually refers only to the northern part of the Transjordan, to refer to all the region east of the Jordan River.

New Testament commentators speak of Jesus' "Perean Ministry", beginning with his departure from Galilee (Matthew 19:1; Mark 10:1) and ending with the anointing by Mary in Bethany (Matthew 26:6) or his journey towards Jerusalem commencing from Mark 10:32.

Other sites named Perea
The Christian Armenians who were deported from Armenia and forcibly settled in the New Julfa/Isfahan region of Iran named a major village "Perea" in honor of the important significance of Perea as the resting place of John the Baptist.

Hasmonean incorporation
 Hasmonean dynasty

Herodian incorporation
The Herodian kingdom of Judaea

Later incorporation

See also
Transjordan (Bible)
Transjordan (region)
Gilead
Amathus
Livias
Machaerus

References

External links
 Perea entry in historical sourcebook by Mahlon H. Smith

Judea (Roman province)
New Testament regions
Jews and Judaism in the Roman Empire
Regions of Jordan
Jordan in the Roman era
Herodian kingdom
Herodian Tetrarchy
Transjordan (region)